Born Lucky is an American television series in which contestants earned mall money and prizes. It was hosted by Bob Goen and announced by Jonathan Coleman. Four contestants competed in a stunt game show taped at various shopping malls for a chance at $2,000 to shop at that mall. The first week's shows of Born Lucky were taped at the Glendale Galleria in California.

The show aired on Lifetime from October 5, 1992, to April 2, 1993. After the last episode aired, the show went into reruns on the same network from July 5 to December 31, 1993. For a brief period in 2000, PAX TV aired reruns of this series.

The show was loosely based on a 1989 British game show of the same name hosted by Jeremy Beadle.

Format
Each player had a chance to win up to $100 (in what was referred to as "mall money") in the first round by participating in a stunt, such as trying to follow a sequence of commands, moving an item through a maze using a magnet held in the mouth in 60 seconds, or solving a series of brain teasers. Each stunt had five or ten parts and the contestant earned $10 or $20 for a fraction of  success. The top two highest scoring players moved on to Round 2. Regardless of the outcome of the round, all contestants received a prize chosen blindly from a set of cards that were fanned out. If there was a tie (for last place, or if all tied), each person picked an envelope containing "mall money" not counting toward their scores. The player(s) who picked the most cash went on to round two.

Challenge Round
In the second round, the two remaining players bid against each other to see who could accomplish the stunt (à la Name That Tune'''s Bid-a-Note'' round). All stunts were played in either a 30, 45, or 60-second time limit. If the person accomplished the stunt before time ran out, he or she won. Otherwise, the opponent moved on.

Bonus Round
The winning player then got a chance to win a total of $2,000 (including tiebreaker winnings, if any) by accomplishing a series of 5 additional stunts in 90 seconds. They could pass on only one stunt and if time permitted, they went back to that stunt and he/she had to complete that remaining stunt to win the $2,000 in cash; otherwise, he/she received $100 for each stunt accomplished.

References

Lifetime (TV network) original programming
1990s American game shows
1992 American television series debuts
1993 American television series endings
Television series by Stone Stanley Entertainment
English-language television shows